St Stephen, Saint Stephen or St Stephens may refer to:

Saints
 Saint Stephen (d. ), first Christian martyr
 Pope Stephen I (d. 257)
 Saint Ysteffan, credited as the founder of Llansteffan in Wales
 Stephen the Younger, (d. 764), the most prominent iconodule martyr 
 Saint Stephen of Hungary ( – 1038), the last Grand Prince of the Hungarians (997–1000) and the first King of Hungary (1000–1038)
 Saints Stephen Theodore Cuenot and Stephen Vinh of the Vietnamese Martyrs
 Socrates and Stephen, martyrs 
 Saint Stephen Harding (d. 1134), co-founder of the Cistercian Order
 Saint Stephen of Perm (1340–1396), Russian monk and apostle of the Permians
 Saint Stephen the Hymnographer

Orders of knighthood
 Holy Military Order of Saint Stephen Pope and Martyr, founded in 1561 by grand duke Cosimo I of Tuscany
 The Royal Hungarian Order of Saint Stephen, founded in 1764 by queen Maria Theresa of Hungary

Places
Canada
 St. Stephen, New Brunswick
 Saint Stephen Parish, New Brunswick, a civil parish
 the parish of Saint Stephen, a local service district in the southwestern corner of the parish

United Kingdom
 St Stephen-by-Launceston, Cornwall
 St Stephen by Saltash, Cornwall
 St Stephen-in-Brannel, Cornwall, colloquially known as St Stephens
 St Stephen, Hertfordshire

United States
 St. Stephen, Minnesota
 St. Stephen, South Carolina

Churches
 St. Stephen's Church (disambiguation)

Music
 "St. Stephen" (song) by the Grateful Dead, on their album Aoxomoxoa

See also
 Saint Etienne (disambiguation)
 San Esteban (disambiguation)
 Santo Estêvão (disambiguation)
 St. Stephens (disambiguation)